Bobby Futrell (August 4, 1962 – June 1, 1992) was a professional American football player who played cornerback for five seasons for the  Tampa Bay Buccaneers. Futrell recorded 4 career interceptions, 19 passes defensed, and 134 career tackles in his time with the buccaneers. He also played in the USFL for three teams. Futrell was found hanged in his Tampa garage shortly after an argument with his wife.

References 

1962 births
1992 suicides
People from Ahoskie, North Carolina
American football cornerbacks
Elizabeth City State Vikings football players
Tampa Bay Buccaneers players
Suicides by hanging in Florida